Parabacteroides chongii  is a Gram-negative,  obligate anaerobic, non-spore-forming, rod-shaped and non-motile bacterium from the genus of Parabacteroides which has been isolated from blood of a person who suffered from peritonitis.

References 

Bacteroidia
Bacteria described in 2019